Suwaibou Sanneh (born 30 October 1990) is a Gambian sprinter who specializes in the 100 metres. He was born in Brikama. He set a personal best and national record time of 10.16 seconds during the Twilight Series Meet #3 on 30 May 2013 in New York City.

He reached the semi-final at the 2008 World Junior Championships and competed at the 2008 Olympic Games without progressing to the second round. Finishing fifth in his heat with a time of 10.52 seconds.

Sanneh competed at the 2012 Summer Olympics in the Men's 100m event and set a new Gambian record in the event with 10.21, managing to advance to the semifinals, where he again set the national Men's 100m record with 10.18, before being eliminated.

References

External links
 

1990 births
Living people
Gambian male sprinters
Olympic athletes of the Gambia
Athletes (track and field) at the 2008 Summer Olympics
Athletes (track and field) at the 2012 Summer Olympics
World Athletics Championships athletes for the Gambia
Commonwealth Games competitors for the Gambia
Athletes (track and field) at the 2010 Commonwealth Games